The Myawady Daily is a military-owned newspaper published by the Military Affairs Security Department's Directorate of Public Relations and Psychological Warfare of Myanmar. The newspaper was officially launched on 2 April 2011, two days after the civilian-elected members of government were sworn in.

The Myawady Daily is part of the Burmese military's extensive media portfolio, which include Myawaddy TV, Thazin FM, a radio station, The Yadanabon, Ngwetayi, a lIterary magazine, Thutha Alin, a knowledge journal, Agaza Myingwin, a sports publication, and Tayza Aurora, a children's publishing house.

See also

List of newspapers in Myanmar
Media of Myanmar

References

External links
 

Daily newspapers published in Myanmar
Publications established in 2011
State media